Bhadra Union is a union of Nagarpur Upazila, Tangail District, Bangladesh. It is situated 8 km south of Nagarpur and 31 km south of Tangail city.

Demographics

According to Population Census 2011 performed by Bangladesh Bureau of Statistics, The total population of Bhadra union is 21,950. There are 5,101 households in total.

Education

The literacy rate of Bhadra Union is 41.3% (Male-46.2%, Female-36.9%).

See also
 Union Councils of Tangail District

References

Populated places in Dhaka Division
Populated places in Tangail District
Unions of Nagarpur Upazila